Cyclothone pseudopallida, commonly known as the slender bristlemouth, is a species of ray-finned fish in the genus Cyclothone.

References

Gonostomatidae
Fish described in 1964